Diethylenetriamine (abbreviated Dien or DETA) and also known as 2,2’-Iminodi(ethylamine)) is an organic compound with the formula HN(CH2CH2NH2)2.  This colourless hygroscopic liquid is soluble in water and polar organic solvents, but not simple hydrocarbons. Diethylenetriamine is structural analogue of diethylene glycol. Its chemical properties resemble those for ethylene diamine, and it has similar uses. It is a weak base and its aqueous solution is alkaline. DETA is a byproduct of the production of ethylenediamine from ethylene dichloride.

Reactions and uses
Diethylenetriamine is a common curing agent for epoxy resins in epoxy adhesives and other thermosets.  It is N-alkylated upon reaction with epoxide groups forming crosslinks.

In coordination chemistry, it serves as a tridentate ligand forming complexes such as Co(dien)(NO2)3.

Like some related amines, it is used in oil industry for the extraction of acid gas.

Like ethylenediamine, DETA can also be used to sensitize nitromethane, making a liquid explosive compound similar to PLX. This compound is cap sensitive with an explosive velocity of around 6200 m/s and is discussed in patent #3,713,915. Mixed with unsymmetrical dimethylhydrazine it was used as Hydyne, a propellent for liquid-fuel rockets.

DETA has been evaluated for use in the Countermine System under development by the U.S. Office of Naval Research, where it would be used to ignite and consume the explosive fill of land mines in beach and surf zones.

See also
 Triethylenetetramine

References

External links

Ethyleneamines
Amine solvents
Chelating agents
Rocket fuels
NMDA receptor antagonists
Secondary amines